Double or Quits (French: Quitte ou double) is a 1953 French comedy film directed by Robert Vernay and starring Zappy Max, Suzanne Dehelly and Danielle Godet. It was shot at the Epinay Studios outside Paris. The film's sets were designed by the art director Claude Bouxin. Along with Zappy Pax it features several performers who had become famous on the Radio Circus show on Radio Luxembourg.

Synopsis
Charlotte, a mature librarian from Bourganeuf in Limousin is a huge fan of Zappy Max, the host of a popular radio show. She sends him letters but to impresses him also sends him the picture of an attractive younger woman Marie. When Zappy arrives in the city as part of his national tour Charlotte persuades Marie to take her place in a meeting and the two fall in love. Meanwhile, Charlotte enters as a contestant in the radio show's double of quits game and wins money.

Cast
 Zappy Max as 	Zappy Max
 Suzanne Dehelly as Charlotte Nodier
 Danielle Godet as 	Marie Chassagne
 Jean Tissier as 	Joly
 René Blancard as 	Maîtee Albert Chassagne
 Roland Armontel as 	Chassagne - le père de Marie
 Paul Azaïs as 	Tonio
 Line Renaud as 	La chanteuse
 Georgette Anys as 	Une spectatrice
 France Asselin as 	La jeune mère de l'enfant malade
 Gaby Basset as Une voisine
 Léon Berton as 	Le concierge de la mairie	
 Thomy Bourdelle as Le chef monteur
 Jean Clarieux as Le chauffeur	
 Max Dalban as 	Le cafetier
 Marcelle Féry as La femme du barbu
 Fernand Gilbert as Un spectateur
 Gérard Lucas as 	Henri
 René Marc as 	Un employé de Radio-Luxembourg
 Jacques Marin as 	Lucien
 Marie Navarre as 	La servante
 Jean-Marie Serreau as Panard
 Solange Sicard as La paysanne

References

Bibliography 
Dyer, Richard & Vincendeau, Ginette. Popular European Cinema. Routledge, 2013.
 Rège, Philippe. Encyclopedia of French Film Directors, Volume 1. Scarecrow Press, 2009.

External links 
 

1953 films
French comedy films
1953 comedy films
1950s French-language films
Films directed by Robert Vernay
Films shot at Epinay Studios
Films set in France
1950s French films